London East was a federal electoral district represented in the House of Commons of Canada from 1968 to 1997. It was located in the province of Ontario. This riding was created in 1966 from parts of London and Middlesex East ridings.

It was initially defined as consisting of the eastern parts of the City of London, Ontario, and the Township of London. In 1976, it was redefined to consist of the eastern part of the City of London.

The electoral district was abolished in 1996 when it was redistributed between London West, London—Adelaide and London—Fanshawe ridings.

Members of Parliament

This riding elected the following members of the House of Commons of Canada:

Electoral history

 
 
|National Socialist
|Martin K. Weiche  
|align="right"|89  
|align="right"|0.3% 
|}

The former Village of London East
'London East' was a village that was annexed by the London, Ontario on August 20, 1884, and taking effect on January 1, 1885. The boundaries of London East were Adelaide Street to the west, Oxford Street to the north, Highbury Avenue to the east and the South branch of the Thames River to the south.

See also 
 List of Canadian federal electoral districts
 Past Canadian electoral districts

External links 
 Parliamentary website

Former federal electoral districts of Ontario
Politics of London, Ontario